JS Mogami (FFM-1) is the lead ship of the Mogami-class frigate of the Japan Maritime Self-Defense Force (JMSDF). She was named after the Mogami River and shares her name with a World War II heavy cruiser Mogami and Cold War destroyer escort Mogami.

Development and design 

In 2015 the Japanese defense budget allocated funds to study the construction of a new “compact-type hull destroyer with additional multi-functional capabilities” as well as a new radar system for the destroyer. In the same year Mitsubishi Heavy Industries (MHI) unveiled the frigate's first concept model (30FF) which they have been developing with their own funds.

The 30DX design has an overall length of 130 m, breadth of 16 m, a standard displacement of 3900 tons with a full load displacement of about 5500 tons, and a maximum speed of over 30 knots. Weapons include a Mk 45 gun, two remote weapon station above the bridge, 16 Mk 41 VLS at the bow, 8 anti-ship missiles, one SeaRAM, an SH-60Lhelicopter, torpedoes, and decoy launchers. It can also deploy and recover UUV, USV, and sea mines from the rear ramp beneath the helideck. It is also expected to use a naval version of the Type 03 Chū-SAM.

Construction and career
Mogami was laid down on 29 October 2019 at Mitsubishi Heavy Industries, Nagasaki and launched on 3 March 2021, four months behind schedule because of problems with the British MT30 gas turbines. She will be expected to be commissioned on 28 April 2022.
She commissioned on 28 April 2022 and deployed to Yokosuka Naval Base. The ceremony was attended by Makoto Oniki, Vice Minister of Defense, Ryo Sakai, Chief of the Maritime Staff, and Atsuo Suzuki, Director General of the Defense Acquisition Agency. MHI's Naohiko Abe, Managing Executive Officer and General Manager of the Defense & Space Segment.

When JS Mogami was completed, it was not equipped with VLS, but the budget for VLS will be appropriated later and VLS will be installed.

Gallery

References

External links 

2021 ships
Ships built by Mitsubishi Heavy Industries
Mogami-class frigates